ParkinsonSAT, PSat or Naval Academy OSCAR 84 is a U.S. technology demonstration satellite and an amateur radio satellite for Packet Radio. It was built at the U.S. Naval Academy and was planned as a double satellite (ParkinsonSAT A and B). The name ParkinsonSAT was chosen in honor of Bradford Parkinson, the father of the GPS system. After successful launch, the satellite was assigned the OSCAR number 84.

Mission
The satellite was launched on May 20, 2015, with an Atlas V rocket along with the main payload X-37B OTV-4 and 9 other CubeSat satellites (X-37B OTV-4, GEARRS 2, LightSail A, OptiCube 1, OptiCube 2, OptiCube 3, USS Langley, AeroCube 8A, AeroCube 8B and BRICSat-P) from Cape Canaveral AFS, Florida.

ParkinsonSAT is a student satellite project. It was partly funded by the Aerospace Corporation. It has a transponder for transmitting telemetry from remote measuring points (eg drifting buoys). This telemetry is to be transmitted to a network of ground stations. A second transponder enables multi-user text transmission in PSK31 mode. This transponder was built by the Brno University of Technology.

Originally, the project consisted of 2 identical satellites: PSat-A and PSat-B, 2 identical 1.5U Cubesats, which should be brought together in a 3U starter into space. During the long wait for a launch opportunity in 2014, the construction of the satellite was changed again. The solar cells have been replaced by new, more efficient cells. The other originally named PSat-B CubeSat was rebuilt and started as BRICSat-P.

Frequencies
 406 MHz Ocean Data Telemetry Microsat Link (ODTML)
 145.825 MHz APRS Uplink and Downlink (1200 Band AX.25)
 435.350 MHz PSK31 Downlink (FM, 300 mW)
 28.120 MHz PSK31 Uplink (SSB, 25 W)

See also

 OSCAR

References

External links
 Psat (ParkinsonSAT) Design Page
 ParkinsonSAT. U.S. Naval Academy Satellite Lab

Satellites orbiting Earth
Amateur radio satellites
Spacecraft launched in 2015
CubeSats
Technology demonstration satellites